Notascea straba is a moth of the  family Notodontidae. It is known only from Cuzco region in Peru.

External links
discoverlife.org

Notodontidae of South America
Moths described in 2008
Notodontidae